Michel Delacroix may refer to:

Michel Delacroix (painter) (born 1933), French painter
Michel Delacroix (politician), Belgian politician